Icheon Ceramic Festival is a South Korean festival opened every year in Gyeonggi-do province.

About
Icheon, Gyeonggi-do has been a valuable city for ceramic arts since the Bronze Age. In 2010, the city was designated as "City of Crafts and Folk Art" on the UNESCO Creative Cities Network. A variety of South Korea's finest ceramics such as Cheongja (celadon porcelain), Baekja (white porcelain) and Buncheong (grayish-blue powered celadon) are exhibited in this festival. This festival is Korea's largest ceramic culture festival and is a free exhibition that takes place every year during April and May.

History
The first Icheon Ceramic Festival was held at the event area of Seolbong Hotel in the form of small scale ceramic market. During the time, revenue of the festival was only 20 million won. As a part of the Seolbong Cultural Festival, Icheon Ceramic Festival was organized by Icheon Cultural Center until the 8th festival in 1994. It was a small-scaled local festival due to insufficient budget and low participation of ceramic artists.

Ceramic product hall
Ceramic products
Ceramic road booth
Docent operated

Exhibitions
Meeting of tradition and modernization
Symposium
Ceramic road workshop
Ceramic making demonstration and large ceramic performance
Ceramic exhibition

Events and performance
Icheon youth art festival
B-boy graffiti contest
Face painting
Nail art
Invitation performance by military music group
Street performances
Hands-on programs

Gallery

Location
The festival takes place at Seolbong Park which can be reached by taking an intercity bus from Dong Seoul Bus Terminal or Seoul Express Bus Terminal to Icheon Bus Terminal, which is a 10-minute drive to the destination.

References

External links

Ceramics
Korean pottery